National Tertiary Route 411, or just Route 411 (or ) is a National Road Route of Costa Rica, located in the Cartago province.

Description
In Cartago province the route covers Turrialba canton (Turrialba district).

References

Highways in Costa Rica